Nils Lofgren is a 1975 album by Nils Lofgren, also known as the "Fat Man Album". It was his first solo album, following the breakup of his group, Grin.

The album was critically praised at the time of its release, most notably in a 1975 Rolling Stone review by Jon Landau. The 1983 Rolling Stone Record Guide said it was a "tour de force of unquenchable vitality and disarming subtlety."  In 2007, nearly 32 years after the release of Nils Lofgren, the album was again praised by Rolling Stone in the "Fricke's Picks" column, where David Fricke said it was one of 1975's best albums. The album was on the Billboard 200 chart for nine weeks and peaked at number 141 on May 10, 1975.

In 2007 the album was finally re-mastered and rereleased by Hip-O Select after being out of print for nearly a decade on compact disc.

The circus billboard that appears on the cover of this album also appears in an episode of The Monkees television series, "The Monkees at the Circus," season 1, episode 22.

Track listing
All songs by Nils Lofgren except where noted.

 "Be Good Tonight" – 0:50
 "Back It Up" – 2:23
 "One More Saturday Night" – 3:09
 "If I Say It, It's So" – 3:00
 "I Don't Want to Know" – 2:45
 "Keith Don't Go (Ode to the Glimmer Twin)" – 4:23
 "Can't Buy a Break" – 3:19
 "Duty" – 2:57
 "The Sun Hasn't Set on This Boy Yet" – 2:48
 "Rock and Roll Crook" – 2:55
 "Two by Two" – 3:07
 "Goin' Back" (Gerry Goffin, Carole King) – 3:51

Personnel

Musicians
 Nils Lofgren – guitars, piano, vocals
 Wornell Jones – bass
 Aynsley Dunbar – drums
 Stu Gardner – backing vocals (tracks 2, 3, 4, 6)

Technical
 David Briggs – producer, engineer
 Roland Young – art direction
 Junie Osaki – design
 Ed Caraeff – photography

References

1975 debut albums
Nils Lofgren albums
Albums produced by David Briggs (producer)
A&M Records albums
Rykodisc albums